The Nations Team Event competition at the 2011 World Championships ran on February 16 at 11:00 local time, the seventh race of the championships. Athletes from the best 16 nations in the FIS Overall Nations Cup ranking competed.

Rules 

The 16 best nations in the FIS Overall Nations Cup Ranking were eligible to participate in this event. If one or more nations didn't start, they were not replaced. Each team consisted of 4 to 6 skiers, but at least two female and two male skiers.

The format was a K.O. round competition with the pairings being made according to the Nations Cup Ranking. In each pairing 2 female & 2 male skiers from each team raced a parallel giant slalom in a best-of-4 system. In the event of a tie, the faster cumulated time of the best male and the best female skier decides which team will advance to the next round.

FIS Overall Nations Cup standing (prior to the World Championships)

Participating teams

Results bracket 

 (f) = In the event of a tie, the faster cumulated time of the best male and the best female skier decides which team will advance to the next round

Results

As Norway, Slovenia, Finland, Japan, and Liechtenstein chose not to participate, the 5 highest-placed teams (Austria, Switzerland, France, Italy, United States) in the FIS Overall Nations Cup Ranking received a bye in the qualification round.

1/8 Final

1/4 Final

Semifinals

Finals

In the end France won the title with three 2-2 results, always with the faster total time of the best male and the best female racer.

And the final victory was decided by 1/100 of a second: if Kirchgasser had raced 0,01 sec faster (or Marmottan 0,01 sec slower) the result would have been 3:2 for Austria.

References

Nations team event